Communauto is a Canadian carsharing company based in Montreal, Quebec, Canada, that operates in fifteen Canadian cities and Paris, France. As of March 2018 it had 40,000 users, and a fleet of approximately 2,000 free-floating and station-based vehicles.

Communauto provides automobile reservations to its members, billable by the hour or day; members may have to pay a monthly or annual membership fee in addition to car reservation charges.

Members can reserve vehicles with Communauto's mobile app, online, or by phone at any time, either immediately or up to a month in advance. Communauto members have automated access to the cars using an access card which unlocks the door; or using the mobile application. The keys are already located inside. Communauto may charge a deposit, an annual fee, and a reservation charge, depending on the plan chosen. Fuel, parking, insurance, and maintenance are included in the price.

History 

Communauto was founded in Quebec City in 1994 by Benoît Robert, its current CEO. Cycling advocate and environmentalist Claire Morissette played a major role in its evolution starting in 1995, when Communauto established itself in Montreal as a private company. As of 2017, the company had close to 50,000 users and over 2,000 vehicles.

Communauto acquired Paris, France-based Mobizen in 2012, merged with Ottawa-based VRTUCAR in 2016, and acquired CarShare Atlantic in 2018.

Communauto's goal is to provide a convenient and economical alternative to owning a car. 

In June 2022, Communauto expanded to the city of Trois-Rivieres.

Membership 

Communauto has various membership plans for its members; they are suited for different kinds of users, from infrequent users to frequent users.

Services 

Communauto offers two kinds of vehicles: round-trip vehicles and Flex vehicles. Round-trip vehicles must be returned to their station after use, and are best suited for planned trips. FLEX vehicles, only offered in some cities, can be picked up and dropped off within a designated area. They are best suited for spontaneous or one-way trips.

Fleet 

Communauto has various vehicles available in its fleet. However, the majority of vehicles available are compact and sub-compact vehicles.

Common vehicles in the Communauto fleet

Sedan 

 Toyota Corolla (sedan)

Hatchback 

 Toyota Yaris
 Toyota Prius C
 Kia Rio
 Toyota Prius V
 Nissan LEAF
 Kia e-Niro

SUV 
Hyundai Venue

City coverage and partnerships

Communauto operates as Communauto (VRTUCAR) in six cities in OntarioWaterloo, Hamilton, London, Guelph, Kingston, and Toronto. It operates as Communauto in five cities in QuebecMontreal, Quebec City, Trois-Rivieres, Gatineau and Sherbrooke, Calgary, Edmonton, Halifax, Ottawa, and Paris, France.

Communauto's users-per-vehicle ratio can rise in winter to 20 users per vehicle and drops to about 15 users per vehicle in summer.

In Paris, France, the company signed a partnership in May 2017 with the local public-transport operator, RATP Group. As of May 2019, 200 cars are available across 100 sites located in Paris and close suburbs.

Impact 
The impact of carsharing in Quebec was evaluated in a study from Communauto and conducted by Tecsult Inc. in 2006. With an estimated 168,000 tons of  emissions eliminated per year as a result of carsharing.

Cyber Attack 
On January 8, 2021, Communauto notified customers that it has been the victim of a cyber attack. CEO Benoit Robert assured that no potentially sensitive data including account passwords or credit card information were accessed.

References

External links

 Communauto official website

1994 establishments in Quebec
Carsharing
Companies based in Montreal
Transport companies established in 1994
Privately held companies of Canada
Transport companies of Canada
Canadian companies established in 1994